Shiradwad is a village in Belgaum district of Karnataka, situated on the bank of Dudhaganga River.The Village has population of around 3000 (Approx) with Kannada being the mainly spoken language followed by Marathi. Shiradwad is also known as Chand Shiradwad to differentiate it from another village with the same name in Maharashtra. The word Chand is derived from the famous shrine built on the bank of Dudhaganga river named, 'Chand Peer Dargah'. However the official name of the town remains as Shiradwad. The residents of Shiradwad mainly depend on agriculture, but the rise in literacy rate and industrial zones in the nearby area have also contributed to a large extent on the living and economic conditions of its residents. Prominent among people from different communities who reside in shiradwad are Jains, Lingayats, Muslims, Kurubas, Marathas, Scheduled Castes and Scheduled Tribes. Shiradwad was adopted by Mr. Prakash Babanna Hukkeri, the then MP of the territory under Sansad Adarsh Gram Yojana in 2014.

Banks and Financial Societies
 The Arihant Co-Op Credit Souhard Ltd.
 ICICI (Industrial Credit and Investment Corporation of India).
 Siddheshwar Co-op Credit Society.
 Mallikarjun Co-op Credit Society.
 Bireshwar Co-op Credit Society.
 Basav Co-op Credit Society.
   
Temples and Prayer Stations
 Shri 1008 Parshwanath Digambar Jain Mandir.
 Shri Mahadev Mandir.
 Shri Hanuman Mandir.
 Shri Vitthal Rukmai Mandir.
 Shri Birdev Mandir.
 Shri Gautam Buddha Vihar, Shiradwad.
 Hajrat Chand Peer Dargah.

Tourism and Attractions

Shiradwad is situated 42 km to east from Kolhapur (a hub of many tourist places like Mahalakshmi temple, Rankala lake and Panhala fort). Shiradwad is approximately 195 km from the coastals of Goa, 295 km from Pune. In the vicinity there are other popular places to visit like Amboli, Gokak-Falls, Godchinmalki, Stavanidhi, Toranhalli, Narasimhwadi, Kanerimath.

References

Villages in Belagavi district